Wild Boar Fell is a mountain in the Yorkshire Dales National Park, on the eastern edge of Cumbria, England. At , it is either the 4th-highest fell in the Yorkshire Dales or the 5th, depending on whether nearby High Seat (2,326 ft) is counted or not.

To the east, on the opposite side of the narrow dale, are High Seat and Hugh Seat.

Wild Boar Fell is on the boundary of the civil parishes of Mallerstang and Ravenstonedale.

History
According to Wainwright the fell gets its name from the wild boar which inhabited the area over 500 years ago.

In earlier times, probably up to the mid 19th century, the Millstone Grit, or gritstone, which forms the flat top of the fell, was used for making millstones. Some partly formed millstones can be seen on the eastern flank of the fell — and also on the corresponding western flank of Mallerstang Edge on the opposite side of the dale. Sand (composed of Millstone Grit) from the beach of Sand Tarn was used by local people to sharpen knives and scythes; they made ‘strickles’ by sticking the sand to wooden blocks with tar.

A tusk, claimed to be of ‘the last wild boar caught on the fell’, is kept in Kirkby Stephen parish church.

During the Second World War Wild Boar Fell was used by the British Army at Warcop Training Area for training tank crews to operate in difficult terrain.

Geography
Wild Boar Fell is a dramatic sight and a landmark for many miles around. When approached from the north, it gives the misleading impression that it is a peak. However, from the south of the dale at Aisgill, its true profile is seen, not dissimilar to Ingleborough, with steep sides and a flat top (consisting of a cap of millstone grit).

The classic route for walking up Wild Boar is via the bridleway from Hazelgill Farm, ascending west to High Dophinsty before following Scriddles ridge top to Blackbed Scar. A boggy expanse is present on top of the plateau.

The views from the top make a spectacular panorama. The Howgills, Pennines, the Lake District fells, the Yorkshire Three Peaks can all be seen and, on a clear day, there is even a glimpse of the sea at Morecambe Bay.

A common feature of many Pennine dales and Lake District fells are the groups of cairns on the high ground. There seems little agreement on when, why, or by which people such cairns were built. (One common suggestion, that they were built by shepherds as markers for paths, may explain some of the cruder ‘piles of stones’; but groups like those on The Nab are ambiguous.)

References

External links

A walk through Mallerstang

Marilyns of England
Hewitts of England
Peaks of the Yorkshire Dales
Nuttalls
Mountains and hills of Cumbria
Regionally Important Geological / Geomorphological Sites (RIGS) in Cumbria
Ravenstonedale
Mallerstang